The Welsh Place-Name Society was founded in 2011 with the aim of promoting an awareness and understanding of the study of place-names and their relationship to the languages, environment, history and culture of Wales.

History 

On 20 November 2010 Cymdeithas Edward Llwyd held a conference on the subject of Welsh toponymy at Plas Tan y Bwlch. In that meeting it was agreed to form the Welsh Place-Name Society. The Society was officially formed at a conference held on 1 October 2011 at the National Library of Wales in co-operation with the University of Wales Centre for Advanced Welsh and Celtic Studies.

Activity 

The Society holds an annual conference and publishes a bulletin twice a year. It also runs various projects and holds event in various part of Wales.

References 

2011 establishments in Wales
Welsh toponymy